List of assassinations and assassination attempts attributed to the Assassins (the Nizaris of Alamut), active in Western Asia, Central Asia, and Egypt, in the 11th through 13th centuries.

Background

The Assassins were a group of Nizari Ismaili Shia Muslims that, by capturing or building impregnable forts, established a "state" of their own inside the hostile territories of the Seljuk Empire, a Sunni Muslim government, first in Persia and later in Iraq and the Levant. Lacking a conventional army, in order to survive, they started using unconventional tactics such as assassination of prominent enemy figures and psychological warfare.

Assassination

The precise ideology that motivated the assassins are unclear. Most of the assassinations by the Nizaris took place during the first decades of their struggle, which helped them to create a local political power. Their first and boldest assassination was that of Nizam al-Mulk, the vizier and de facto ruler of the Seljuk Empire.

Those assassinated were usually the enemies of the Nizari Ismaili sect, but also sometimes people of political importance who are killed in exchange for money paid by some local ruler. This tactic caused resentment against them, and there is a correlation between the assassinations and subsequent massacres of the Nizaris. This tactic gradually declined and the later attributed assassinations are probably of local origination. It should be taken into account that medieval Arabic sources generally tend to attribute most of the assassinations of this period to the Ismailis.

The assassins gained access to the victims through betrayal of confidence and carried out the attack in a ritual manner. Some of the assassins were sleeper cells, notably by befriending or being employed by the victim, sometimes remaining unrecognized for years.

The names of the assassin and their victims were written in a roll of honor kept in Alamut Castle, recorded by later Muslim authors.

List

References

Assassins
 
Iran history-related lists
Syria history-related lists
11th century-related lists
12th century-related lists
13th century-related lists
Lists of events in Asia
Isma'ilism-related lists
11th-century deaths
12th-century deaths
13th-century deaths